The 1900 Primera División was the 4th. season of top-flight football in Uruguay.  Nacional won its second title after beating CURCC at a final match due to both teams had finished in the first position.

Overview 
The tournament consisted of a round-robin championship. It involved seven teams, and the champion was Club Nacional de Football. This would be their second national conquest and the second consecutively.

With respect to the previous edition, the tournament featured the incorporation of Montevideo Wanderers. There was no promotion or relegation for the following season.

Teams

League standings 

The match Triunfo - Montevideo Wanderers was not contested.

Final playoff

References
Uruguay – List of final tables (RSSSF)

Uruguayan Primera División seasons
1903 in South American football leagues
1903 in Uruguayan football